The Billiard Congress of America (BCA) is the governing body for cue sports in the United States and Canada, and the regional member organization of the World Pool-Billiard Association (WPA). It was established under this name in 1948 as a non-profit trade organization in order to promote the sport and organize its players via tournaments at various levels. The BCA is headquartered in Broomfield, Colorado. The voting members of the organization are mostly equipment manufacturers.

The BCA publishes an annual rule and record book that incorporates the WPA world standardized rules for games such as nine-ball, eight-ball, ten-ball and straight pool, as well as rules for other games that are not presently the subject of international competition, such as one pocket, bank pool,  cowboy pool, rotation, American snooker, and Chicago among many others. The BCA holds an annual trade show, the International Billiards & Home Recreation Expo. Also annually, it inducts great players, and those who have made great contributions to the sport, into the BCA Hall of Fame.

History
The origins of the BCA began with the National Billiard Association of America (NBAA), founded July 25, 1921. The organization rapidly became the de facto governing body of the sport in the United States, with 35,000 members by 1928, and was closely tied to the Brunswick-Balke-Collender company, a major equipment manufacturer. After a decline in influence in the late 1930s, in part owing to a dispute with world carom billiards champion Willie Hoppe, the NBAA reformed in 1941 as the Billiard Association of America (BAA). Headquartered in Chicago, Illinois, and calling itself "the Governing Body of Billiards", the BAA produced a concise, portable, inexpensive rulebook of carom and pool games that was to serve as the model for future BCA releases. The BAA in turn became the BCA in 1947. The BCA formed with, and for several years shared offices with, the promotional trade association National Billiard Council (NBC), now defunct. Early BCA rulebooks were essentially identical to the 1946 BAA edition, including the cover art and the absence of the increasingly popular game nine-ball from the ruleset. (Nine-ball did not appear until the 1967 edition.) The BCA rulebooks have remained in near-annual continuous publication to the present day.

In 2000, the BCA made the major move of adopting the World Pool-Billiard Association's standardized rules for eight-ball, nine-ball, and other games subject to international professional competition. The BCA had by this time become the national affiliate of the WPA. In the new edition of the rules, the organization expressed a commitment to seeing pool and carom billiards become Olympic sports (and in fact selected Colorado Springs for its new headquarters for proximity to the US Olympic Committee). The rules changes have not been without controversy, as some of them upset US player expectations; various leagues have ignored the new rules and continued with traditional US rules (e.g., in the game of eight-ball, legally pocketing the 8 ball on the  has commonly been treated as an instant win).

BCA Hall of Fame

International Billiard & Home Recreation Expo
The BCA's annual Billiard Expo (as it is known for short, or simply the Expo, within the industry) is the largest mostly-cue-sports trade convention in the world, and despite its broad name is primarily focused on pool (pocket billiards). It has been held in various locations, most frequently Las Vegas, Nevada, since its founding in 1984. The Expo is exclusively sponsored by the BCA (and its members), and is managed by William T. Glasgow, Inc. of Orland Park, Illinois. The expressed purpose of the event is to "provide industry manufacturers, distributors, retailers, dealers and poolroom operators an annual venue for new business opportunities, including education, new products and networking." Vendor attendance in 2006 was nearly 300 companies filling between 1,300 and 1,400  booth spaces. The June 25–27, 2009 event at the Sands Expo and Convention Center in Las Vegas saw 116 exhibitor in 412 booth spaces, with 1,120 buy attendees. The next event will be held June 14 (Wednesday) through 16 (Friday), 2010, at the Las Vegas Convention Center, with registration for attendees opening February 15. These were not the original dates, and some debate surrounded the matter, with the dates being finalized only as late as September 2009, and chosen to ensure maximum attendance by billiard entrepreneurs, most of whom have business peaks on weekends. By the end of the 2009 Expo, 65 companies had already contracted for 326 booth spaces at the 2010 Expo.

The vast majority of attendees are industry insiders, rather than players. In 2006, 94% were billiard retailers, 5% billiard hall operators, and 1% "other" (e.g. bowling and amusement center operators). In 2009, only 70% were retailers. In that year, 83% were from the United States and 7% from Canada, with the remaining 10% being from elsewhere around the world. Despite operators not being in the majority, the event is geared toward them, with "Business of Billiards" seminars on successful hall operation, and exhibitors principally in the business of supplying such venues. Exhibiting vendors typically include product lines such as pool equipment (tables, cues, racks, chalk, etc.), billiards-themed apparel and accessories, instructional materials, bar and billiard furniture and furnishings (stools, neon signs, juke boxes, etc.), business services (food processing, point-of-sale computer systems, etc.), other commercial gaming equipment (darts, table shuffleboard, foosball, video games, pinball machines, etc.), plus assorted home recreation categories (poker, home spas and pools, tanning beds, sound systems, outdoors equipment, etc.), and billiard-related services such as cue repair. The BCA claims that, as of 2009, 55% of attendees make purchasing decisions for their businesses, 50% buy there, and 20% more buy within one month of the show.

While Las Vegas is the most frequent host city for the event, it has also been held in Charlotte, North Carolina, Houston, Texas, Baltimore, Maryland, New Orleans, Louisiana, Kansas City, Missouri, Orlando, Florida, Minneapolis, Minnesota, Nashville, Tennessee, Louisville, Kentucky, and Ft. Worth, Texas.

As of the 2010 event, the cost per  exhibitor booth varied from US$1,350 to $1,800 depending upon BCA membership status. The event ticket price was $100 for non-exhibitors and non-members. These prices were up from $1,200 and $50, respectively, in 2007.

BCA Pool League
The BCA Pool League (BCAPL) is one of the major amateur pool leagues in the United States and is present in over a dozen other countries outside the U.S., with a significant presence in Canada. Originally operated by the BCA, since 2004 the BCAPL has been owned and operated by billiards event promoter CueSports International (CSI) of Henderson, Nevada.

The BCA Pool League has approximately 450 local leagues with 60,000+ members. Leagues are played on both bar-size  and regulation  tables. Beginning in the 2009/2010 season, CSI introduced a second league, the USA Pool League (USAPL), aimed at a more casual player. Both the BCAPL and USAPL (who share a rulebook) use BCA rules, with the addition of wheelchair rules, team play adaptations, and "Applied Rulings" from years of large-scale tournament administration.

Collegiate National Championship 
The US Collegiate Pocket Billiards National Championship, organized by the Association of College Unions International (ACUI) since 1937, with separate men's and women's divisions since 1939, is recognized and supported by the BCA. The amateur tournament's annual champions are listed in the BCA's Billiards: The Official Rules and Records Book.

United States Billiard Media Association
The United States Billiard Media Association (USBmA) was organized in January 2007 to elect "billiard media members to the Billiard Congress of America's Hall of Fame Board". This media-focused suborganization also lists other goals in its materials, including "elevating the visibility and status of billiards in the media at large" as well as various member-support functions. Membership is strictly limited to "professional print, radio, TV, public relations and Internet media persons who cover cue sports", as determined by the USBmA executive board. As of February 2010, the group listed 33 members, including most of the better-known names in US-based cue sports publishing. USBmA is nominally based in Chicago, Illinois, at the same address as Billiards Digest (Luby Publishing).

See also
 List of professional sports leagues
 BCA Hall of Fame

References

External links
 BCA official website
 BCAPL official website 
 BCA Expo official website
 List of BCA Champions

Cue sports governing bodies in the United States
Pool organizations
Pool leagues
Carom billiards organizations
Snooker governing bodies
Snooker in the United States
Professional sports leagues in the United States